Chased by the Dogs or The Thief and the Dogs (translit. El less wal kilab) is a 1962 Egyptian film directed by Kamal El Sheikh, based on the 1961 novel The Thief and the Dogs by Naguib Mahfouz. It was entered into the 13th Berlin International Film Festival. The film was also selected as the Egyptian entry for the Best Foreign Language Film at the 35th Academy Awards, but was not accepted as a nominee.

Cast
 Shadia as Nour
 Shukry Sarhan as Saeed Mahran
 Kamal Al-Shennawi as Raouf Elwan
 Samir Sabri as Taleb
 Fakher Fakher
 Salah Mansour

See also
 List of submissions to the 35th Academy Awards for Best Foreign Language Film
 List of Egyptian submissions for the Academy Award for Best Foreign Language Film

References

External links

1962 films
1962 crime drama films
Egyptian crime drama films
1960s Arabic-language films
Egyptian black-and-white films
Films based on Egyptian novels
Films directed by Kamal El Sheikh
Films based on works by Naguib Mahfouz